Eugene or Gene Scott may refer to:

Gene Scott (1929–2005), pastor
Eugene Scott (baseball) (1889–1947), Negro leagues catcher
Gene Scott (tennis) (1937–2006), tennis player
Eugene Scott (journalist), American journalist

See also

Eugenie Scott (born 1945), American physical anthropologist
Jean Scott (disambiguation)